Smerillo is a comune (municipality) in the Province of Fermo in the Italian region Marche, located about  south of Ancona, about  northwest of Ascoli Piceno and about  west of Fermo, on a spur midway from the Monti Sibillini and the Adriatic Sea.

It houses several remains of the medieval castle and walls. Also notable are the churches of Santa Caterina and San Ruffino.

References

Cities and towns in the Marche